The Days of My Life is an autobiography of H. Rider Haggard.

He wrote it in 1910–12 but did not publish it until his death  – he made express allowance for this in his will.

References

External links
Complete book – Volume 1 at Project Gutenberg
Complete book – Volume 2 at Project Gutenberg

1926 non-fiction books
Works by H. Rider Haggard
British autobiographies
Literary autobiographies
Books published posthumously